The Djiboutian Navy is the naval service branch of the Djibouti Armed Forces. It is responsible for securing Djibouti's territorial waters and  seaboard as well as supporting army operations. The primary objective of the navy is to safeguard the nation's maritime borders,  act to deter or defeat any threats or aggression against the territory, people or maritime interests of Djibouti, both in war and peace. Through joint exercises and humanitarian missions, including disaster relief, the Djiboutian Navy promotes bilateral relations between nations. It has a fleet of gunboats, fast missile boats and support, training, which can be deployed to defend the territorial waters and coastline of Djibouti as well as protect tankers passing through the Bab-el-Mandeb strait.

The navy was built and structured with assistance from the United States since the end of the Cold War, but has also relied on other sources for equipment in some areas. Djiboutian forces are an important player in the Bab-el-Mandeb and Gulf of Aden.

History 
The Navy was founded in 1979 and began a significant expansion with France assistance in 1981. Initially it comprised the remnants of the Gendarmerie and was focused on port safety and traffic monitoring. The Djiboutian Navy is the naval service branch of the Djibouti Armed Forces. It is responsible for securing Djibouti's territorial waters and  seaboard.  This is an area known to have considerable fish stocks, sustaining an active fisheries industry. 

The acquisition of the several boats from the US in 2006 considerably increased the navy's ability to patrol over longer distances and to remain at sea for several days at a time. Cooperation with the US and Yemeni navies is also increasing in an effort to protect and maintain the safety and security of the Sea Lanes of Communication (SLOC). The Navy is upgrading itself with the following technological developments.

Bases 
The main bases of the Djiboutian Navy are located in:
Djibouti City
Obock
Tadjoura
Khôr ʽAngar
Maskali Island

Mission 

The Djiboutian Navy is part of the Djibouti Armed Forces. Its mission includes the protection of Djiboutian territory and sovereignty, as well as the controlling the exclusive economic zone. 

Other tasks include the maintenance, preservation and the provision of naval services in support of other state departments and authorities, including search and rescue, protection of maritime resources, and diplomatic sea transport support.

Naval Equipment

References 

Navy
Military units and formations established in 1979
Djibouti
Navy